Prostynia may refer to the following places in Poland:
Prostynia, Lower Silesian Voivodeship (south-west Poland)
Prostynia, Choszczno County in West Pomeranian Voivodeship (north-west Poland)
Prostynia, Drawsko County in West Pomeranian Voivodeship